Me-Kwa-Mooks Park is a  public park located in the West Seattle neighborhood of Seattle, Washington, USA. Me-Kwa-Mooks, meaning "shaped like a bear's head" and pronounced sbuh-KWAH-buks in Nisqually, was what the Duwamish tribe called the West Seattle peninsula when the first European-American settlers landed at Alki in 1851.

Today's Me-Kwa-Mooks Park is land that was acquired by the Parks Department in 1971. The site was originally the homestead of the pioneers Ferdinand and Emma Schmitz. When all the Schmitz family died it became city land.

In 1994, 4th and 5th graders from Pathfinder K-8 School helped make Me-Kwa-Mooks a park. In 2009, Pathfinder moved to Cooper Elementary School, a 10-year-old building on the other side of West Seattle, so they could no longer work on the park.

Me-Kwa-Mooks Park is across the street from the Emma Schmitz Memorial Overlook and immediately south of Me-Kwa-Mooks Natural Area. Picnic tables are set up on the lawn at the park entry (on Beach Dr. SW between SW Genesee and SW Oregon St.). Most of the park stretches up the hillside and extends north and farther south on land that is largely undeveloped. The dense trees provide habitat for many birds, including screech owls.

Immediately across the street, below Emma Schmitz Memorial Overlook, is a rocky beach that is accessible during low tide. The tidepools here are rich in limpets, lumpsuckers, blennies, chitons, nudibranches, sea stars, sea slugs, sea cucumbers, hermit crabs and an array of other tidepool dwellers.

References

External links
Parks Department page on Me-Kwa-Mooks Park
Map of Me-Kwa-Mooks Park

Parks in Seattle
West Seattle, Seattle